Heacham is a large village in West Norfolk, England, overlooking The Wash. It has been a seaside resort for over a century and a half.

History
There is evidence of settlement in the Heacham area over the last 5,000 years, with numerous Neolithic and later Bronze Age finds within the parish. This is presumably because the local geology consists of primarily cretaceous sands and underlying chalk, meaning that there is very little surface water for miles in any direction. This can also be seen along the banks of the Caudle Carr outside Dersingham, where numerous archaeological finds have been made. Running water along with fertile surrounding lands made Heacham an ideal place for settlement by early man. Evidence of habitation continues through the Iron Age into the Romano-British era.

However, the present village probably did not appear until the 5th century, with the Anglo-Saxon invasion and the beginnings of present-day East Anglia.

The name of the village is said to derive from a 12th-century Norman lord, Geoffrey de Hecham. This is possible, but unlikely, as the name "de Hecham" literally means "of Hecham", implying that the place name already existed. The name Hecham was noted in the Little Domesday Book, written around 1086 as part of the Smithdon hundred (Smetheduna). Before the Norman Conquest, Heacham was held by two Saxons, Alnoth, and Toki the king's thegn, whose estates centred around a hall in Castle Acre. After the Norman Conquest, the lands passed to William de Warenne and his brother-in-law Frederick de Warenne, who was later killed by Hereward the Wake.

The name Heacham is more likely to derive from the local river, the Hitch, in conjunction with the Old English place-word "ham", which meant either "homestead, village, manor, estate" or "enclosure, land hemmed by water or marsh or higher ground, land in a river bend, river meadow, promontory".

In 1085 Heacham manor was given by William de Warenne to a cell of Cluniac monks from the Priory of St Pancras of Lewes, to pray for the soul of his late wife Gundreda. After the dissolution, about 1541, the manor passed to Thomas Howard, 3rd Duke of Norfolk.

Medieval economy
In 1272 Heacham was granted by royal charter a weekly market on Wednesdays and 3 days during the mid-August Fairs on 14, 15 and 16 August.

By 1300 the population of Heacham was estimated at 1200 to 1500, making Heacham a small town.

In the market women in the upper layer of Heacham tenant families were prominent the Heacham ale and bread market. Even in the baking sector where men had a large share in the production of bread, women dominated the market by their numbers. The market involved women from all of the community, top to bottom, with 531 women belonging to 231 families. Between 1276 and 1324, around the time of the great European famine, the Leet Court sessions listed many women selling ale or bread who were not able to pay the licensing tax and were declared by the aletasters and the steward presiding the court condonatae causa paupertatis (pardoned for the sake of poverty).

The participation of women in the market gave them opportunity to build economic and public roles in the community. As examples Matilda Peper was elected aletaster in 1314. Alice de Redham, Alice Genever1307; Alice, Isolda and Sabina Elnot, 1310; Isabel Rocelin, 1315 and again 1320; Agnes le Notere, 1324) were elected collectores. 

The survey Inquisitio Navium of 1337 mentions 12 Heacham tenants owning fishing ships. The richest, Simon Lambriht , had 7 ships ranging from 5 tons to 32 tons.  

There was some long-distance trade, wood from Scandinavia or woollen cloth from Flanders, stone from Normandy.  The bulk of the Heacham traffic was with other Norfolk ports, and especially Bishop’s Lynn where Heacham sent fish, salt, corn in bulk or flour sacks , and sacks of wool. Heacham was the maritime outlet for a number of land-locked manors in North West Norfolk. The Heacham demesne accounts mentions its horse-drawn carts often transporting a harvest surplus as far as Fakenham. 

The port of Heacham imported from Lynn goods for everyday life, particularly for the building trades. It imported mill-stones and iron manufactured goods, nails, horseshoes, iron parts for the ploughs and tools, the carts and the mills, leather and wool manufactured goods for clothing and the farming economy.

The ships that enabled this trade would be Cogs, flat bottomed boats widely used from the North Sea to the Baltic.

Church
The Church of St Mary the Virgin is the oldest functioning building. Norman in style, it dates from 1230. The earliest record of the church, covenant for building a chapel to the Blessed Virgin Mary being 1248. In the cupola on the tower hangs a bell dating from about 1100, making it the oldest in East Anglia and seventh oldest in the country. The transepts  from the east end have been lost and the roof has been lowered.

John Rolf
In about 1619 John Rolfe, a native of this village, wrote from Jamestown, Virginia, to Sir Edwin Sandys, treasurer of the Virginia Company of London, with the first record of African slaves arriving in North America<ref:</ref> 
"About the latter end of August, a Dutch man of Warr of the burden of a 160 tunnes arrived at Point-Comfort, the Comandors name Capt Jope, his Pilott for the West Indies one Mr Marmaduke an Englishman. They mett with the Treasurer in the West Indyes, and determined to hold consort shipp hetherward, but in their passage lost one the other. He brought not any thing but 20. and odd Negroes, which the Governor and Cape Marchant bought for victualls (whereof he was in greate need as he pretended) at the best and easyest rates they could."

Pocahontas

Heacham has historic ties to Matoaka (better known as Pocahontas), who married John Rolf (sic) on 5 April 1614 at a church in Jamestown, Virginia. Rolfe took his wife, Rebecca (Pocahontas), and their two-year-old son, Thomas, to visit his family at Heacham Hall in 1616, but settled in Brentford. A year later, Rebecca died in Gravesend, when John was going to return her to Virginia. She was laid to rest at St George's parish churchyard. After that, John returned to Virginia with Tomocomo. Samuel Argall commanded the ship. Thomas was guarded by Lewis Stukley and later adopted by John's brother Henry. John married Jane Pierce two years later. They soon had a daughter named Elizabeth. Perhaps John lost his life in the 1622 Native American massacre near Jamestown. The Rolfe family residence, Heacham Hall, burned down in 1941.

Beaches

Heacham became popular as a seaside resort with the Victorians, when the railway between King's Lynn and Hunstanton opened in the early 1860s. This culminated in the building of the Jubilee Bridge in 1887 to replace an old wooden bridge, using unspent subscriptions from parishioners to the celebrations for Queen Victoria's Diamond Jubilee. Heacham is still popular as a seaside resort. Both the North Beach (Jubilee) Road and South Beach Road are lined with caravan parks.

Heacham's beaches are on the east banks of The Wash. They are among the few in eastern England where the sun sets over the sea, not the land.

On 29 July 1929, Mercedes Gleitze became the first woman to swim The Wash, completing the crossing on a third attempt. Originally aiming for Hunstanton, she came ashore at Heacham after battling strong tides for over 13 hours.
Heacham was badly affected by the North Sea flood of 1953: nine people died when the sea broke through. In early 2013, an exhibition of the North Sea Flood was held at St Mary's Church, with contributions from Heacham's infant and junior schools and from other villagers.

Norfolk lavender

Norfolk Lavender Ltd was founded in 1932. Linn Chilvers supplied the plants and the labour and Francis Dusgate of Fring Hall the land. The first lavender beds were planted on Dusgate's land at Fring; in 1936 Dusgate acquired Caley Mill on the River Heacham and the ground around it, not for building but for the land. Lavender has been grown there ever since. A kiosk was erected, from which bunches of lavender were sold to passing pre-war traffic.

By 1936 Caley Mill was disused. No major repairs were carried out until 1953–1954, after a new A149 road with a lay-by and kiosk had been built, which cut across the lavender field. Further repairs and restoration were carried out at the mill in 1977–1978 and in the late 1980s. Since the early 1990s its output has widened to include other typical English floral fragrances. These are sold at home and abroad.

Transport
Frequent bus services via Heacham are run by Lynx between King's Lynn and Hunstanton. The village railway station was open from 1862 to 1969.

Notable people
In birth order:

William de Warenne, 1st Earl of Surrey (died 1088), held land here.
John Rolfe (1585–1622), early settler in Virginia and husband of Pocahontas, was born here.
Charles Atmore (1759–1826), Wesleyan evangelist, was born here.
Robert Gunther (1869–1940), historian of science at Oxford University, is buried here.
John Metcalfe (1891–1965), novelist, was born here.
Patrick Hadley (1899–1973), composer and conductor, retired here.
Moss Evans (1925–2002), general secretary of the Transport and General Workers' Union, died here.
Judy Cornwell (born 1940), actress, went to school here.
Colin Garwood (born 1949), professional footballer, was born here.
Mary Mackie (living), writer of romance and non-fiction, lives here.
James Donaldson (born 1957), professional basketball player, was born here.
Trisha Goddard (born 1957), TV presenter, went to primary school here.
Brendan Coyle (born 1962), actor, lives here.

See also
The River Heacham
Heacham railway station

References

External links

Heacham – Community website
Heacham Online
William White's History, Gazetteer, and Directory of Norfolk 1845
1891 Census of Heacham
Norfolk Lavender

 
Villages in Norfolk
Civil parishes in Norfolk
Beaches of Norfolk
Populated coastal places in Norfolk
King's Lynn and West Norfolk